Mzolisi Yoyo (born December 25, 1977) is a South African lightweight boxer based in Mdantsane. His record stands at 11 wins and 2 losses after 13 bouts.

References

External links
 

1977 births
Living people
South African male boxers
Lightweight boxers
People from Mdantsane
Sportspeople from the Eastern Cape